The twelfth season of Big Brother Suomi premiered on 6 September 2020 and was aired on Nelonen. This season was longer than the eleventh season and ran for 12 weeks. 

Elina Kottonen returned to host the main show. The Daily Show was co-hosted by Kimmo Vehviläinen and Alma Hätönen.

Due to the COVID-19 pandemic, all of the official housemates must test negative for COVID-19 twice before entering the house. Housemates directly entered the house on their own without being introduced one by one at the studio during the live launch show. Each live show on Sunday featured a small live studio audience that is sitting loosely while wearing face masks.

The house this year is designed by Aalto University's space design students.

Housemates

Effect by the evicted housemate 
During this season, the evicted housemate still got the chance to influence the house.

House division 
On launch night, it was revealed by the host that half of the housemates would not enter the Big Brother House, instead, they entered the BB Summer Cottage. The BB Summer Cottage is located in the task area on the roof of the Big Brother House. Both areas were merged since the end of the weekly task of Week 3.

Nominations table 
The first housemate in each box was nominated for two points, and the second housemate was nominated for one point.

Notes 
 : Big Brother split the housemates into two groups, with one group staying in the Main House and the other in the Summer Cottage. They could only vote for housemates in their own group. Only one housemate from each area would be nominated.
 : After Tiia was evicted, Minna was fake evicted from the Main House and transferred to the BB Summer Cottage without the knowledge of the Main House housemates.
 : Sini left the house on Day 9 for personal reasons.
 : The Cottage lost the final performance of the duel-weekly mission and the Main House received protection from nominations.
 : The viewers voted for Kristiina to receive two rescue points. The rescue points are deducted from the total nomination points.
 : All housemates were up for eviction and two housemates would be evicted.
 : Only new housemates were up for eviction. Two of them would be evicted.
 : Julia and Vili were immune from the eviction as they are new housemates.
 : The viewers voted for Marko to receive two rescue points. The rescue points are deducted from the total nomination points.
 : This week, the nomination was up to the viewers. The two housemates who received the most votes are up for eviction. Then, housemates cast their votes on which one of them to leave.
 : Fake nominations took place in the house.  This time, housemates voted for who they wanted to stay.
 : For the final week, the public were voting to win rather than to save. The housemate who received the least votes to win would be evicted on Friday, and the next housemate with the least votes to win would be evicted on Saturday.

Nominations points received

References

External links 

 Official website
 Big Brother Suomi at Ruutu.fi

12
2020 Finnish television seasons